Ily or ILY may refer to:

ILY sign, an informal sign in American Sign Language for "I like you"
Iły, Kuyavian-Pomeranian Voivodeship, Poland
Iły, Masovian Voivodeship, Poland
Islay Airport, Scotland (IATA code)
"Ily (I Love You Baby)", a 2019 song by Surf Mesa
"ILY (Yokubō)", a 1999 song by Olivia

See also
I Love You (disambiguation)
Illy (disambiguation)